David Maximiliano "Maxi" González (born 4 May 2004) is an Argentine footballer currently playing as a midfielder for Lanús and for the U-20 national team.

International career
González was called up to the Argentina national under-20 football team for the 2022 Maurice Revello Tournament in France.

In January 2023, he was once again called up to the national under-20 football team ahead of the 2023 South American Championship.

Career statistics

Club

References

2004 births
Living people
Sportspeople from Buenos Aires Province
Argentine footballers
Argentina youth international footballers
Association football midfielders
Argentine Primera División players
Club Atlético Lanús footballers